Kushk-e Khaleseh-ye Bala (also Romanized as Kūshk-e Khāleşeh-ye Bālā and Kūshk-e Khāleseh Bālā; also known as Kūshk-e Bālā) is a village in Lajran Rural District, in the Central District of Garmsar County, Semnan Province, Iran. At the 2006 census, its population was 692, in 200 families.

References 

Populated places in Garmsar County